The hyperpolarizability, a nonlinear-optical property of a molecule, is the second-order electric susceptibility per unit volume.  The hyperpolarizability can be calculated using quantum chemical calculations developed in several software packages. See nonlinear optics.

Definition and higher orders 

The linear electric polarizability   in isotropic media is defined as the ratio of the induced dipole moment  of an atom to the electric field  that produces this dipole moment.

Therefore the dipole moment is

In an anisotropic medium  and  can be in different directions and the polarisability is now a tensor. 

The total density of induced polarization is the product of the number density of molecules multiplied by the dipole moment of each molecule, i.e.

 
In a nonlinear optical medium, the polarization density is written as a series expansion in powers of the applied electric field, and the coefficients are termed the non-linear susceptibility.

where the coefficients χ(n) are the n-th-order susceptibilities of the medium, and the presence of such a term is generally referred to as an n-th-order nonlinearity. In isotropic media  is zero for even n, and is a scalar for odd n. In general, χ(n) is an (n + 1)-th-rank tensor.
It is natural to perform the same expansion for the non-linear molecular dipole moment

i.e. the n-th-order susceptibility for an ensemble of molecules is simply related to the n-th-order hyperpolarizability for a single molecule by

With this definition  is equal to  defined above for the linear polarizability.

See also
Intrinsic hyperpolarizability

References

External links 
 The Nonlinear Optics Web Site

Nonlinear optics